Nationality words link to articles with information on the nation's poetry or literature (for instance, Irish or France).

Events
 In Denmark, Anders Bording begins publishing Den Danske Meercurius ("The Danish Mercury"), a monthly newspaper in rhyme, using alexandrine verse, single-handedly published by the author from this year to 1677

Works published
 George Alsop, A Character of the Province of Maryland, English Colonial American
 Edmund Waller, Instructions to a Painter (the first 64 lines had been published anonymously on a single sheet in 1665)
 George Wither, Sigh for he Pitchers

Births
Death years link to the corresponding "[year] in poetry" article:
 November 12 – Mary Astell (died 1732), English feminist writer

Deaths
Birth years link to the corresponding "[year] in poetry" article:
 February 12 – Mildmay Fane, 2nd Earl of Westmorland (born 1602), English nobleman, politician, and writer
 June 15 – Łukasz Opaliński (born 1612), Polish nobleman, poet, writer and political activist
 June 16 – Sir Richard Fanshawe (born 1608), English diplomat, translator and poet
 June 30 – Alexander Brome (born 1620), English
 October – James Shirley (born 1596), English poet and playwright
 November – Jeremias de Dekker (born 1610), Dutch
 November 3 (bur.) – James Howell (born 1594), English pamphleteer and poet
 Gysbert Japiks (born 1603), Frisian writer, poet, schoolteacher and cantor
 Jean Ogier de Gombauld (born 1576), French playwright and poet

See also

 Poetry
 17th century in poetry
 17th century in literature
 Restoration literature

Notes

17th-century poetry
Poetry